Telaga is a community of agriculturists (Kapus) in the Coastal Andhra Pradesh, concentrated in the West and East Godavari districts. They are also found  in smaller numbers in Visakhapatnam and Srikakulam districts. Telaga is regarded as a subcaste of Kapu.

History 
The Telagas are believed to be descendants of Telugu Chodas.

Categorisation
In 2002, K. Srinivasulu describes Telaga as a "backward peasant caste".

In a September 2015 order, the Chief Secretary of the Andhra Pradesh government noted: "It has been felt that Kapu, Balija, Telaga and Ontari Communities in the state are socially, educationally and economically in the backward condition than the other forward castes though it is being treated as a forward caste." In the said order, the government proposed the setting up of The Andhra Pradesh State Kapu Welfare and Development Corporation Limited for the social development of various groups including the Telaga community.

In the 2014 election, the Kapu community supported the Telugu Desam Party, which won and formed the government. In 2015, the community petitioned the government to classify them as Other Backward Class for improving youth education and employment. The government appointed a three-member commission led by K. L. Manjunath. But even before the commission submitted a report, the government passed a bill in December 2017 categorising the community as an Other Backward Class and reserving 5% of the places in educational institutions and government jobs.

Since the state's reservations exceeded 50%, an approval from the Central Government became necessary. The Central department of personnel and training objected to the inclusion of Kapus as it was not supported by facts. The government subsequently allocated 5% reservation out of the 10% allocated to Economically Weaker Sections. This too was found to be legally untenable, and the new government led by YSR Congress reversed the decision.

Political participation 
Selig S. Harrison noted that, in the 1955 legislature of what was then Andhra State, the Telagas had 16 legislators, next only to the Reddis and Kammas. He states that they formed a "newly active political force". However, despite their strength, the Telagas did not hold any ministerial posts.

In 1982, Telagas joined the other Kapu castes to form the Kapunadu movement, launched in Vijayawada. The movement held annual/biannual meetings since then.

For the 1983 election for the united Andhra Pradesh, the Kapus in general supported the newly formed Telugu Desam Party. Among the elected, the Telagas made up 6 legislators, compared to 9 legislators belonging to other Kapu castes from the coastal districts. However, the Kapus found that this did not lead to any increase in their political power. They renewed their movement within a couple of years.

According to scholar Balagopal, "The Munnuru Kapus, Balijas, Telagas, Tenugus and Mutarasis are collectively referred to as 'Kapus'". They attempted to consolidate into a single community, but "it has remained un-consummated".

Notes

References

Bibliography
 
 

Social groups of Andhra Pradesh